Domenico Fontana (born January 16, 1943 in Marano Vicentino) is a retired Italian professional football player.

He played 12 seasons (186 games, 13 goals) in the Serie A for L.R. Vicenza, A.C. Milan and S.S.C. Napoli.

References

External links
Domenico Fontana @ magliarossonera.it

1943 births
Living people
Italian footballers
Serie A players
L.R. Vicenza players
A.C. Milan players
S.S.C. Napoli players

Association football midfielders